Spartanburg County School District 2 is a public school district in Spartanburg County, South Carolina, US. The district is Led by superintendent Lance Radford and consists of 14 schools. The district also has a maintenance and transportation department to serve the students and staff. Students in the district have access to the Swofford Career Center- it is shared with Spartanburg County School District 1.

The district serves much of northeastern Spartanburg County, including all of Boiling Springs, Chesnee and Mayo, most of Valley Falls, and a portion of Southern Shops.

In the 2018-19 South Carolina State Report Card, the district saw great results in academics and other measured areas. One point of emphasis is the district's graduation rate of 90.5%, well above the state average of 81.1%.

The district is proud of its academic and athletic accolades. In 2019, Carlisle-Foster's Grove Elementary was named a National Blue Ribbon School. The Chesnee High School Baseball and Competitive Cheer Teams have each won 5 State Championships. In 2019, Boiling Springs Elementary was named  South Carolina's Distinguished Reading School. In 2013, the district was recognized as the highest performing in South Carolina.  In 2015, Boiling Springs High School Teacher Hunter Jolly was named a finalist for the State Teacher of the Year Award. In 2016, the Boiling Springs High School Football Team was the South Carolina Upper State Champion and fell just short in the SC 5A Championship Game. In 2019, Chesnee High School's Abby Scruggs was named the South Carolina Beta Club President.

List of schools

Elementary schools

 Boiling Springs Elementary School
 Carlisle-Foster's Grove Elementary School
 Chesnee Elementary School
 Cooley Springs-Fingerville Elementary School
 Hendrix Elementary School
 Mayo Elementary School
 Oakland Elementary School
 Shoally Creek Elementary School
 Sugar Ridge Elementary School

Middle and junior high schools
 Boiling Springs Middle School
 Chesnee Middle School
 Rainbow Lake Middle School

High schools
 Boiling Springs High School
 Chesnee High School

References

External links
Spartanburg School District 2 homepage

School districts in South Carolina
Education in Spartanburg County, South Carolina